Chris Sutton (born 1973) is a retired English footballer.

Chris Sutton or Christopher Sutton may also refer to:

 Christopher Sutton (cyclist), Australian cyclist
 Christopher Sutton, American actor, currently in the North American tour of Spamalot
 Chris Sutton, Scottish singer who released his self-titled debut album in 1986, produced by Peter Wolf
 Chris Sutton, musician for the bands Dub Narcotic Sound System, and C.O.C.O.
 Chris Sutton, former drummer for the band The Old Haunts